Fur Khorj (also Romanized as Fūr Khorj; also known as Faraḩābād, Forkhoraj, and Fūrkhorī) is a village in Siyahu Rural District, Fin District, Bandar Abbas County, Hormozgan Province, Iran. At the 2006 census, its population was 315, in 88 families.

References 

Populated places in Bandar Abbas County